Starbright is an album by guitarist Pat Martino which was recorded in 1976 and first released on the Warner Bros. label.

Reception

The AllMusic site rated the album with 3 stars. Thom Jurek called it "a startling yet warm and, in retrospect, wonderful recording of originals and covers."

Writing for All About Jazz, Douglas Payne commented: "As always, Martino remains an engaging technical dazzler - as opposed to all those forgotten 70s guitar heroes who thought speed and sound meant good playing. Martino even experiments with guitar synthesizers and other effects... But the strength of the guitarist's melodic personality, particularly during signature solos, is never in question."

Track listing 
All compositions by Pat Martino except as indicated
 "Starbright" - 3:38   
 "Eyes" (Joseph d'Onofrio) - 2:36   
 "Law" - 3:35   
 "Fall" (Wayne Shorter) - 2:04   
 "Deeda" - 3:43   
 "Starbright Epilogue" - 0:31   
 "Masquerada" - 2:53   
 "Nefertiti" (Shorter) - 2:51   
 "Blue Macaw" - 3:03   
 "City Lights" (Gil Goldstein) - 0:55   
 "Prelude" - 6:30   
 "Epilogue" - 1:00

Personnel 
Pat Martino - guitar, synthesizer
Al Regni - flute
Joe D'Onofrio - violin
Gil Goldstein - keyboards
Mike Mainieri, Warren Bernhardt - synthesizers 
Will Lee - electric bass
Charles Collins, Michael Carvin - drums
Alyrio Lima Cova - percussion

References 

Pat Martino albums
1976 albums
Warner Records albums